Lady Winifred (Winnie) Taretaufi Kamit  is a Papua New Guinean lawyer. In the 2006 Birthday Honours she was made a Commander of the Order of the British Empire for service to law, commerce and public administration.

Life 
Lady Kamit studied at the University of Papua New Guinea, graduating with a law and arts degree. In 1998 she joined Gadens Lawyers in Port Moresby, becoming a partner  in 1993 and a managing partner in 1999.

Lady Kamit's industry and community roles include president of the Papua New Guinea Business Council, councilor and later Trustee of the Papua New Guinea Institute of National Affairs and chair of Coalition for Change Papua New Guinea, an initiative against violence against women and children. She is also patron of the Papua New Guinea Business Coalition for Women. Her director positions have included positions with Newcrest Mining (from 2011 to 2017),  Interoil, Nautilus Minerals Niugini, South Pacific Post, Bunowen Services, Post-Courier, Allied Press, ANZ Banking Group, Steamships Trading Company, Lihir Gold (from 2004 to 2010) and New Britain Palm Oil. In 2017 she was appointed chair of the board of ANZ Banking (Papua New Guinea).

Lady Kamit has also held the position of commissioner of the Public Service Commission.

References

Commanders of the Order of the British Empire
Living people
People from New Ireland Province
People from Tanga Islands
Year of birth missing (living people)
University of Papua New Guinea alumni